Hammond is a single-member electoral district for the South Australian House of Assembly. It is named after Ruby Hammond, the first indigenous woman to stand for the Federal Parliament. Hammond is a rural electorate east and south-east of Adelaide, covering  in the east and upper south-east of the state, and takes in the towns of Callington, Cambrai, Coomandook, Karoonda, Langhorne Creek, Mannum, Nildottie, Peake, Pinnaroo, Purnong and Tailem Bend.

Hammond was created in the 1994 redistribution as a replacement for the electoral district of Ridley, and was first contested at the 1997 election. As it covers a largely conservative rural area, it was easily won by maverick Liberal member Peter Lewis, the former member for Ridley. Lewis briefly and unsuccessfully tried to have the electorate renamed in 1998 on the basis that Ruby Hammond had few ties to the electorate, proposing the revival of the name Murray-Mallee (which had covered most of Hammond's territory from 1985 to 1993), or if a ceremonial name was required, Unaipon, in honour of indigenous writer, preacher and inventor David Unaipon. Lewis was expelled from the Liberal Party in 2000, and successfully recontested the electorate as an independent at the 2002 election, depriving the Liberals of what would have been a safe seat. Lewis backed Labor to form government and was named as Speaker of the South Australian House of Assembly in return for his support. 

Lewis attempted unsuccessfully to shift to the Legislative Council when it became clear that he had little-to-no chance of retaining the electorate at the 2006 election. Liberal Adrian Pederick reclaimed the seat for the Liberals at that election, picking up a swing large enough to revert Hammond to its traditional status as a comfortably safe Liberal seat. Pederick has held the seat without serious difficulty since then. In 2022, the seat became marginal with Pederick only holding it with a 5% margin.

Members for Hammond

Election results

Notes

References
 ECSA profile for Hammond: 2018
 ABC profile for Hammond: 2018
 Poll Bludger profile for Hammond: 2018

1997 establishments in Australia
Electoral districts of South Australia